Peabody Elementary School may refer to

in the United States
 Peabody Elementary School (Colorado) in Centennial, Colorado
 Peabody Elementary School (Illinois) in Chicago, Illinois
 Peabody-Burns Elementary School, in Peabody, Kansas
 Peabody Elementary School (Memphis, Tennessee) in Memphis, Tennessee, listed on the NRHP in Tennessee
 Peabody Elementary School (Trenton, Tennessee) in Trenton, Tennessee
 George Peabody Elementary School in San Francisco, California

See also
 Peabody High School (disambiguation)
 Peabody School (disambiguation)